Keith Cockburn (born 2 September 1948) is an English professional footballer who played as a winger.

References

1948 births
Living people
Footballers from Barnsley
English footballers
Association football wingers
Barnsley F.C. players
Bradford (Park Avenue) A.F.C. players
Grimsby Town F.C. players
Bangor City F.C. players
English Football League players